Moanda Airport (or Moanda-Bangombé Airport)  is an airport serving Moanda, a town in the Haut-Ogooué Province in Gabon. The runway lies to the northeast of the town.

The airport was relocated in December 2010, after two and a half years of construction work, due to the discovery of manganese deposits underneath the old runway. The construction cost of 6 billion CFA francs was entirely financed by the Compagnie minière de l'Ogooué (a local mining company).

See also

 List of airports in Gabon
 Transport in Gabon

References

External links
 
Moanda Airport
OpenStreetMap - Moanda
OurAirports - Moanda

Airports in Gabon